

Consumer UAV Flight Controller List 
Flight controllers for consumer use include closed and open-source hardware and software flight controllers available for use in consumer grade vehicles.

Unmanned aerial vehicles